The Bahamas women's national basketball team is the women's national basketball team of the Bahamas. It is managed by the Bahamas Basketball Federation''.

The Bahamas won the gold medal at the 2015 FIBA CBC Championship for Women.

Head coach position
  Yolett McPhee-McCuin – 2014 - 2017
  Wayde Watson – Since 2018

See also 
 Bahamas men's national basketball team
 Bahamas women's national under-19 basketball team
 Bahamas women's national under-17 basketball team
 Bahamas women's national 3x3 team

External links
Bahamas Basketball Records at FIBA Archive
Latinbasket.com - Bahamas Women National Team

References

Women's national basketball teams
Bahamas national basketball team